The 6th Virginia Regiment was raised on December 28, 1775, at Williamsburg, Virginia, for service with the Continental Army. The regiment would see action at the Battle of Trenton, Battle of Princeton, Battle of Brandywine, Battle of Germantown, Battle of Monmouth and the Siege of Charleston. The regiment was merged into the 2nd Virginia Regiment on May 12, 1779.

References

External links
Bibliography of the Continental Army in Virginia compiled by the United States Army Center of Military History

Virginia regiments of the Continental Army
Military units and formations established in 1775
Military units and formations disestablished in 1779